The Pentium 4 is a seventh-generation CPU from Intel targeted at the consumer market. It is based on the NetBurst microarchitecture.

Desktop processors

Pentium 4

Willamette (180 nm) 
 Intel Family 15 Model 1
 All models support: MMX, SSE, SSE2
 Transistors: 42 million
 Die size: 217 mm2
 Steppings: B2, C1, D0, E0

Northwood (130 nm) 
 Intel Family 15 Model 2
 All models support: MMX, SSE, SSE2
 Model SL68R has box version only, supplied with unattached fan heatsink.
 Transistors: 55 million
 Die size: 146 mm2 (B0 pre-shrink) and 131 mm2 (B0 Shrink, C1, D1)
 Steppings: B0, C1, D1, M0

Prescott (90 nm) 
 Intel Family 15 Model 3 (C0, D0), Intel Family 15 Model 4 (E0, G1)
 All models support: MMX, SSE, SSE2, SSE3
 Intel 64: supported by 5x6, 511 and 519K
 XD bit (an NX bit implementation): supported by 5x5J, 5x6, 511, 519J and 519K
 Transistors: 125 million
 Die size: 112 mm2
 Steppings: C0, D0, E0, G1

Pentium 4 HT

Northwood (130 nm) 
 All models support: MMX, SSE, SSE2, Hyper-threading
 Transistors: 55 million
 Die size: 131 mm2
 C1, D1, M0

Prescott (90 nm) 
 All models support: MMX, SSE, SSE2, SSE3, Hyper-threading
 Intel 64: supported by F-series, 5x1, 517, 524 and few OEM models in E-series (SL7QB, SL7Q8)
 XD bit (an NX bit implementation): supported by 5x0J, 5x1, 517, 524
 Intel Family 15 Model 3
 Model SL7E4 has an unattached fan heatsink.
 Some Socket 478 models supports loadline B (FMB1.0) with reduced TDP to 89 Watts (100.39 Watts peak)
 Some LGA775 models supports Prescott FMB1 (775_VR_CONFIG_04A) with reduced TDP to 85 Watts (100.78 Watts peak) 
 Transistors: 125 million
 Die size: 112 mm2
 Steppings: C0, D0, E0, G1

Prescott 2M (90 nm) 
 Intel Family 15 Model 4
 All models support: MMX, SSE, SSE2, SSE3, Hyper-threading, Intel 64, XD bit (an NX bit implementation)
 Intel VT-x supported by: 6x2 e.g. Model 662 and 672
 Enhanced Intel SpeedStep Technology (EIST) supported by: all except 620.
 Transistors: 169 million
 Die size: 135 mm2
 Steppings: N0, R0

Cedar Mill (65 nm) 
 Intel Family 15 Model 6
 All models support: MMX, SSE, SSE2, SSE3, Hyper-threading, Intel 64, XD bit (an NX bit implementation)
 Transistors: 188 million
 Die size: 81 mm2
 Steppings: B1, C1, D0
 Enhanced Intel SpeedStep Technology (EIST) supported by: C1, D0

Pentium 4 Extreme Edition

Gallatin (130 nm) 
 All models support: MMX, SSE, SSE2, Hyper-threading
 Transistors: 169 million
 Die size: 237 mm2
 Steppings: M0

Prescott 2M (90 nm) 
 All models support: MMX, SSE, SSE2, SSE3, Hyper-threading, EIST, Intel 64, XD bit (an NX bit implementation)
 Transistors: 169 million
 Die size: 135 mm2
 Steppings: N0

Mobile processors

Pentium 4-M

Northwood (130 nm) 
 All models support: MMX, SSE, SSE2, IST
 Die Size: 131 mm2 (initially 146 mm2)
 Package Size: 35 mm × 35 mm
 Steppings: B0, B0 Shrink, C1, D1

Mobile Pentium 4

Northwood (130 nm) 
 All models support: MMX, SSE, SSE2, IST

Mobile Pentium 4 HT

Northwood (130 nm) 
 All models support: MMX, SSE, SSE2, IST, Hyper-threading

Prescott (90 nm) 
 All models support: MMX, SSE, SSE2, SSE3, IST, Thermal Monitor 2, Hyper-threading
 Steppings: D0, E0

See also
 List of Intel Pentium processors
 List of Intel Pentium D processors
 List of Intel Celeron processors (NetBurst-based)
 List of Intel Xeon processors (NetBurst-based)

References

Pentium 4
Intel Pentium 4